The Perfect Weapon: War, Sabotage, and Fear in the Cyber Age is a 2018 book by David E. Sanger.  It discusses the evolution and concerns of cyber warfare, with a focus on the United States and its cyber capabilities.

References

Books about the Obama administration
2012 non-fiction books
Crown Publishing Group books